Kansas has the 26th highest per capita income in the United States, at $20,506 (2000). Its personal per capita income is $29,935 (2003).



Kansas counties ranked by per capita income

Note: Data is from the 2010 United States Census Data and the 2006-2010 American Community Survey 5-Year Estimates.

See also
 Lists of places in Kansas

References

Kansas
Locations by per capita income
Income